Tuen Station is a railway station located in Fetsund in Fet, Norway on Kongsvinger Line. The station was built in 1932. The station is served hourly, with extra rush hour departures, by the Oslo Commuter Rail line R14 operated by Vy.

Railway stations in Fet
Railway stations on the Kongsvinger Line
Railway stations opened in 1932
1932 establishments in Norway